The All India Institutes of Medical Sciences (AIIMS) is a group of autonomous government public medical universities of higher education under the jurisdiction of Ministry of Health and Family Welfare , Government of India. These institutes have been declared by an Act of Parliament as Institutes of National Importance. AIIMS New Delhi, the forerunner institute, was established in 1956. Since then, 24 more institutes were announced. , twenty institutes are operating and four more are expected to become operational until 2025. Proposals were made for six more AIIMS. It is considered as pioneer health institution of South Asia.

History
The first AIIMS was established in 1956 under the All India Institute of Medical Sciences Act, 1956. Originally proposed by the then Prime Minister of India Jawaharlal Nehru for establishment in Calcutta, it was established in New Delhi following the refusal of Chief Minister of West Bengal Bidhan Chandra Roy. The act established AIIMS New Delhi, which was then known simply as All India Institute of Medical Sciences, and gave it the Institutes of National Importance (INI) status. Amrit Kaur was India's first health minister. When the issue of funds for the setup of AIIMS, New Delhi initially came up, it was she who was instrumental in acquiring a huge amount from the New Zealand government. Over the years, she rallied around and was successful in getting donations from international bodies like the Rockefeller Foundation, and the Ford Foundation, as well as from the government of Australia, West Germany and the Dutch government.

In 2003, the Government of India announced the Pradhan Mantri Swasthya Suraksha Yojana (PMSSY) initiative which aimed at "correcting regional imbalances in the availability of affordable/reliable tertiary healthcare services". This was to be done through two main channels: setting up AIIMS-like institutions and upgrading government medical colleges. Though the announcement was made in 2003 during Atal Bihari Vajpayee's tenure, the project was delayed owing to the power shift at the centre. PMSSY was officially launched in March 2006 and six AIIMS-like medical institutes were announced. The six institutes become operational through an Ordinance from September 2012. The All India Institute of Medical Sciences (Amendment) Bill, 2012 was introduced in the Lok Sabha on 27 August 2012 in order to replace that Ordinance. Lok Sabha passed the Bill on 30 August 2012, it was introduced in Rajya Sabha on 3 September 2012 and passed on 4 September 2012. The Act was published on 13 September 2012.

The act also allowed the institutes to operate more autonomously, and awarded them the INI status. In addition, also conferred the power to establish other AIIMS-like institutes by gazette notification and give them equal status.

Phase I
PMSSY was officially launched in March 2006 and six AIIMS-like medical institutes were announced for under-served states in Patna, Bhopal, Raipur, Bhubaneswar, Jodhpur and Rishikesh. They were later retroactively denoted "Phase I institutes".

Phase II 
In 2013 a further gazette notification was made under the same Act, establishing AIIMS Raebareli. It was later denoted as "Phase-II" of PMSSY.

Phase III 
No new institutes were introduced in Phase III.

Phase IV 
These "Phase-IV" institutes, became AIIMS Mangalagiri in Andhra Pradesh and AIIMS Nagpur in Maharashtra, established in 2018 and later AIIMS Gorakhpur in Uttar Pradesh and AIIMS Kalyani in West Bengal, which started operation in 2019.

Phase V 
On 28 February 2015, in the 2015–2016 budget speech, Jaitley announced five more AIIMS, in Jammu & Kashmir, Himachal Pradesh, Punjab, Assam and Tamil Nadu and an "AIIMS-like" institute in Bihar. On 7 November 2015, Prime Minister of India Narendra Modi had announced development package for Jammu & Kashmir which includes the setting up of two AIIMS, in the capital cities of Jammu and Kashmir. Of these seven "Phase-V" institutes, sites have been assigned for at Changsari, near Guwahati, in Assam, Vijay Pur in the Jammu Division of Jammu and Kashmir, Awantipora in the Kashmir Division of Jammu and Kashmir, Bathinda in Punjab, Bilaspur in Himachal Pradesh, Madurai in Tamil Nadu and the latest, Darbhanga in Bihar, which was finally approved in September 2020. In December 2018 the government has approved and assigned funds for the AIIMS in Madurai, and a foundation stone was set in January 2019. AIIMS Bathinda started operation in 2019. AIIMS Bilaspur, AIIMS Guwahati and AIIMS Vijaypur became operational in 2020.

Phase VI 
On 1 February 2017, in the budget presentation for 2017–2018, Jaitley announced two more AIIMS, in Jharkhand and Gujarat. Of these "Phase-VI" institutes, sites were identified in Deoghar for the institute in Jharkhand and in Khandheri near Rajkot for Gujarat. AIIMS Deoghar started operation in 2019 and AIIMS Rajkot in 2020.

Phase VII 
A week after the 2017–2018 budget presentation, on 9 February 2017, Jaitley announced an AIIMS in Telangana. On 17 December 2018, the cabinet approved the AIIMS, to be located in Bibinagar, near Hyderabad. This institute was later denoted as "Phase-VII". It started operation in August 2019.

Phase VIII 
On 1 February 2019, in the presentation of the interim budget for 2019–2020, Piyush Goyal, who was given temporary charge of the Minister of Finance a week earlier, announced an AIIMS in Haryana. This institute was later denoted as "Phase-VIII". In March, the cabinet approved the institute in Manethi, Rewari district.

Additional proposed AIIMSs 
An additional AIIMS was proposed in Ranchi, Jharkhand.

On March 1, 2022 PM Narendra Modi announced an AIIMS for the state of Manipur under the Atmanirbhar Bharat Scheme.

Institutes 
, 5 AIIMS still are under development. In February 2022, the health ministry stated that all 24 new AIIMS will be functional by February 2025. There are also proposals for establishing AIIMS in Arunachal Pradesh, Goa, Karnataka, Kerala, Mizoram & Tripura.

Admissions 
AIIMS (New Delhi) was originally established as a super-specialty tertiary care centre with primary emphasis on research and specialized training facilities. MBBS is the basic medical course at bachelor's degree level. This is followed by master's degree level specialisation in general surgery, general internal medicine, pediatrics and other fields. Superspecialties are those healthcare fields whose practitioners need specialised certification after completing their postgraduation, examples being cardiothoracic and vascular surgery, rheumatology, neurology, and pediatric neurology. There are at least 45 superspecialties at AIIMS (New Delhi) at higher master's degree level. AIIMS also offers MSc and PhD level research courses.

There are about forty-two specialty post-graduate courses conducted at AIIMS (New Delhi). The entry is through a nationwide competitive examination, AIIMS PG, held every six months. Each year nearly 50 thousand medical graduates and 25 thousand dental graduates across the country compete for the limited number of positions, approximately <1% of the candidates are admitted through the process. AIIMS publishes The National Medical Journal of India.

Changes in Entrance Examination pattern under the provisions of NMC Bill 2019 
As per the latest official notification released by the Ministry of Health and Family Welfare, AIIMS, JIPMER -Puducherry, PGIMER -Chandigarh & all INIs (Institutes of National Importance) were directed to not to conduct any Undergraduate entrance exams from 2020 onwards. Government has said that from 2020 session onwards, all such undergraduate admissions would be taken up only through a single national level examination NEET-UG conducted by NTA (National Testing Agency). Many field experts however criticized this exam unification, specifically with respect to AIIMS (New Delhi), citing the reason that the level of questions in AIIMS-UG entrance exams (for both MBBS & BSc Nursing courses separately) used to be of such a higher & deep logical-conceptual thinking capabilities, that they eventually served a greater advantage for selecting the most desirable students for such scientific courses. And that was something really crucial for the main objectives for which AIIMS (New Delhi) was established, which are cutting-edge research, medical innovations and to demonstrate high standards of medical education to all medical colleges and allied institutions in India.

See also 

 Healthcare in India
 Indian states ranking by institutional delivery
 List of hospitals in India

References

 
Technical universities and colleges in India
Medical colleges in India
Nehru administration
Research institutes in Delhi